The 2009–10 season was APOEL's 70th season in the Cypriot First Division and 82nd year in existence as a football club.

Season review

Pre-season and friendlies
The first training session for the season took place on June 10, 2009, at the GSP Stadium and on June 21, the team left to Obertraun in Austria, to perform the main stage of their pre-season training. On July 3, the team moved to Leogang to continue their pre-season preparation. APOEL returned to Cyprus on July 9. During the pre-season training stage in Austria, APOEL played three friendly matches.

Domestic Competitions

LTV Super Cup
APOEL started the season by winning the 2009 Cypriot Super Cup, beating APOP Kinyras 2–1 on 9 August 2009. Sebastián González opened the score for APOP Kinyras in the 4th minute and APOEL equalised with Boban Grnčarov in the 49th minute. The winner came from Nektarios Alexandrou in the 85th minute.

Marfin Laiki League
APOEL finished 2nd in the 2009–10 Cypriot First Division with 65 points, behind champions Omonia which had 74 points. So, APOEL won a place for the 2010–11 UEFA Europa League second qualifying round.

Cypriot Cup
APOEL reached the final of the 2009–10 Cypriot Cup by eliminating Ethnikos Achna (4–2 agg.), Ermis Aradippou (6–0 agg.) and Aris Limassol (2–0 agg.). In the Cup final which held at GSZ Stadium on 15 May 2010, APOEL lost from Apollon Limassol by 2–1. Apollon took the lead in the 1st minute with a goal from Moustapha Bangura and APOEL equalised in the 23rd minute with a header from Marcin Żewłakow. Apollon scored the winner with Giorgos Merkis in the 72nd minute with a header from close range.

UEFA Champions League

The team was the current holders of the Cypriot championship and as such entered the UEFA Champions League qualifying stages. A successful campaign saw them through to the 2009–10 UEFA Champions League group stages by eliminating EB/Streymur (5–0 agg.), FK Partizan (2–1 agg.) and F.C. Copenhagen (3–2 agg.). APOEL were drawn in Group D against Chelsea F.C., F.C. Porto and Atlético Madrid.

On matchday 1, APOEL drew 0–0 against Atlético Madrid at the first game at Vicente Calderón Stadium and won its first ever point in group stages. On matchday 2, APOEL faced up English giants Chelsea F.C. and the Cypriot team was beaten 0–1 by Nicolas Anelka's goal in the 18th minute. On matchday 3, APOEL played against F.C. Porto at Dragão. APOEL took the lead on 22’ from Álvaro Pereira's own goal but Hulk scored two goals on 33’ and 48’ with a penalty and finally lost 2–1.
Then followed another match against F.C. Porto in Nicosia for matchday 4. APOEL stood well but lost 1–0 after Radamel Falcao's goal in the 84th minute. On matchday 5, APOEL drew 1–1 with Atlético Madrid at GSP Stadium. APOEL took the lead in the game in the 5th minute after Nenad Mirosavljević scored, but Atlético Madrid equalised with the Portuguese international Simão Sabrosa on 62 minutes.
For matchday 6, on December 8, 2009 APOEL travelled to London to play against Chelsea F.C. At Stamford Bridge the team had the support of 6,000 fans who traveled from Cyprus. APOEL took the lead on 6th minute with Marcin Żewłakow, but Chelsea scored two goals with Michael Essien on 19’ and Didier Drogba on 26' to make it 2–1. APOEL equalised after Nenad Mirosavljević scored in the 87th minute and the match ended 2–2.

APOEL finished fourth in the group having equal points with Atlético Madrid, but failed to qualify to UEFA Europa League, because of the away goal that Atlético Madrid had scored in Nicosia. At the end of the season Atlético became the eventual winner of the 2009–10 UEFA Europa League.

Current squad
Last Update: February 13, 2010

For recent transfers, see List of Cypriot football transfers summer 2009.
 Also, see List of Cypriot football transfers winter 2009–10.

Squad changes

In:

Total expenditure:  €385K

Out:

Total income:  €80K
{|

Squad stats

Captains
  Marinos Satsias
  Chrysis Michael
  Constantinos Charalambides
  Christos Kontis
Source: apoelfc.com.cy

Club

Management

Kit

|
|
|

Other information

Pre-season friendlies

Competitions

Overall

Marfin Laiki League

Classification

Results summary

Results by round

Playoffs table
The first 12 teams are divided into 3 groups. Points are carried over from the first round.

Group A

Matches
All times for the Domestic Competitions at EET

Regular season

Playoffs

UEFA Champions League

Qualifying phase

Second qualifying round

APOEL won 5–0 on aggregate.

Third qualifying round

APOEL won 2–1 on aggregate.

Play-off round

APOEL won 3–2 on aggregate.

Group stage

Group D standings and fixtures

Matches

LTV Super Cup

APOEL won the 2009 Cypriot Super Cup (11th title).

Cypriot Cup

Second round

APOEL won 4–2 on aggregate.

Quarter-finals

APOEL won 6–0 on aggregate.

Semi-finals

APOEL won 2–0 on aggregate.

Final

Apollon won the 2009–10 Cypriot Cup (6th title).

Notes

References

2009-10
Cypriot football clubs 2009–10 season